The list of shipwrecks in 2009 includes ships sunk, foundered, grounded, or otherwise lost during 2009.

January

2 January

3 January

4 January

11 January

18 January

25 January

30 January

February

5 February

10 February

11 February

15 February

19 February

22 February

25 February

26 February

March

10 March

20 March

24 March

27 March

Unknown date

April

16 April

17 April

25 April

29 April

May

6 May

8 May

11 May

22 May

27 May

June

6 June

14 June

30 June

July

13 July

26 July

31 July

August

3 August

6 August

8 August

12 August

15 August

16 August

20 August

25 August

26 August

September

5 September

6 September

8 September

9 September

10 September

15 September

30 September

October

4 October

11 October

24 October

30 October

November

2 November

13 November

17 November

22 November

28 November

December

4 December

5 December

10 December

16 December

17 December

20 December

23 December

References

External links

2009
 
Ship